Ingo Anderbrügge (born 2 January 1964) is a German former professional footballer who played mostly as an attacking midfielder.

Football career
Anderbrügge was born in Datteln. He started playing professionally with Borussia Dortmund, making his Bundesliga debut on 7 July 1984, in a 2–3 home loss against Borussia Mönchengladbach. After a final poor season, in 1987–88, he moved to FC Schalke 04, then in the second division. In his first three years, he netted a total of 36 league goals, eventually gaining promotion in 1991.

A regular fixture on the team during the next six years, with the UEFA Cup conquest in 1996–97, his only professional accolade (he netted his penalty shootout attempt in the final against F.C. Internazionale Milano), Anderbrügge could only manage however 33 appearances from 1997–2000, and retired after a brief spell with Sportfreunde Siegen, in the third level, having totalled 53 goals in 292 first division contests (397/89 in all three levels).

In March 2008, Anderbrügge began his professional manager career, in the same division where he finished his playing activity, with SV Wacker Burghausen – he had previously managed amateurs SpVgg Erkenschwick and VfB Hüls in Westphalia.

Other ventures
After retiring as a player, and before he started coaching, Anderbrügge played two seasons as a placekicker for NFL Europe team Rhein Fire.

He also founded a football school and, in March 2009, was appointed technical director of the Deutsches Fußball Internat, a boarding school for youths.

Anderbrügge currently works as a pundit and analyst for German TV channel Sport1.

Honours
Schalke 04
 UEFA Cup: 1996–97

References

External links
 
  

1964 births
Living people
People from Datteln
Sportspeople from Münster (region)
German footballers
Association football midfielders
Bundesliga players
2. Bundesliga players
Borussia Dortmund players
FC Schalke 04 players
Sportfreunde Siegen players
Germany under-21 international footballers
German football managers
German players of American football
Rhein Fire players
SV Wacker Burghausen managers
Footballers who switched code
American football placekickers
SpVgg Erkenschwick players
UEFA Cup winning players
VfB Hüls managers
Footballers from North Rhine-Westphalia
West German footballers